Super Mario Bros. Crossover is a fan-made crossover platform Flash video game launched on Newgrounds on April 27, 2010 by Exploding Rabbit. It is based mostly on the gameplay of Nintendo's Super Mario Bros. for the NES. The only major difference is the ability to control characters that debuted in other Nintendo Entertainment System games unrelated to the Mario series, plus the ability to use "skins" of levels and characters from other games and platforms. The latest version available (3.1.21) was released on December 27, 2013.

Gameplay
Super Mario Bros. Crossover is a Flash browser-based platforming game. The game's levels and graphics are all primarily duplicates of those found in Super Mario Bros.; each of the game's eight worlds feature four levels. In three of the levels, the goal is to reach a checkpoint to complete the level, while the final level has the player facing against Bowser in hopes of rescuing Princess Peach. Enemies such as Goombas, Koopa Troopas and Hammer Bros. will block the player's attempt to make it successfully through the level. As Mario and Luigi, the player can jump on enemies to kill them, use Koopa shells to knock enemies over, and acquire powerups from special blocks that serve to boost health, shoot fireballs, or remain invincible for a short period of time. Besides completing the level, the player can also earn coins and points, attempting to achieve a high score.

Crossover varies this formula by adding in several additional main characters in addition to Mario that the player can play. In the same manner as with Super Mario Bros. 2, the player selects one of the additional characters at the start of each level.  Each character, based on other classic Nintendo Entertainment System games, uses different attacks and movements that are related to their original game, as well as their own signature music. These characters are:
Link, based on The Legend of Zelda, uses a sword and boomerang to attack enemies.  Collecting powerups increases the potency of the sword's attacks and the range of his boomerang. He is the only character with fundamental control changes from his original game, being given the ability to jump and thrust his sword upwards and downwards, moves that originated in Zelda II: The Adventure of Link.
Mega Man possesses the Mega Buster which he can use to fire forward to destroy enemies, with additional powerups to increase his firepower, and has the ability to slide under small spaces. Within version 1.1, Mega Man's jump height is reduced but now has the ability to call in Rush, his robotic dog, to assist in high jumps.
Samus Aran, from the Metroid games, also has an arm cannon she can fire and which gains power with powerups. Samus is also able to transform into her "morph ball" form, rolling through narrow spaces and planting bombs. As of Version 1.1, the player starts off playing as Samus in her Zero-Suit, and upon the capture of a mushroom, gains her Power Suit. In Version 1.2, Samus can pick up missiles when enemies are defeated. Each missile sprite icon gives Samus 2 missiles.
Simon Belmont, the protagonist of the early Castlevania games, has a whip and can throw axes at foes, the attack strength and number of axes on screen increasing with additional powerups. He has the ability to double jump, which he doesn't have in the original games. His jump was also modified to be easier to control than the original games, but can be changed back in the options with Classic mode.
Bill Rizer, one of the playable characters in Contra use a gun to fire on enemies, which increases in power and spread with further powerups. He can shoot in 8 directions, even when jumping.
Ryu Hayabusa from Ninja Gaiden was added in the version 1.1 release. Ryu, as a ninja, is able to use a sword and throwing stars, and has the ability to climb and jump walls.
Sophia the 3rd, the tank vehicle from Blaster Master, was added in the version 1.2 release. Sophia's capabilities include hovering, clinging to walls and ceilings, and homing missiles, but it is also the first character with a limited amount of ammunition and power, requiring the player to refill these capacities through collection from defeated foes.
Luigi, Mario's brother from the Super Mario Bros. series, was introduced in version 2.0. Luigi uses his gameplay from Super Mario Bros.: The Lost Levels, being able to jump higher at the cost of reduced traction, which makes it harder to avoid enemies and pitfalls.
Bass, from Mega Man 10, was introduced in version 2.0 and has similar play to Mega Man, but his arm cannon acts differently, being able to shoot in 7 directions. Instead of a slide, Bass has a dash that is faster than Mega Man's but cannot slide under small spaces. Like in Mega Man & Bass, he can double jump.

In the version 2.0 update, character skins were a new and unique feature that allowed all characters to look different and have new music along with them. Some skins are the same character but from a different game in their respective franchise, while others are from completely different franchises. The 3.0 update added additional character skins, special rendering modes to mimic other earlier computer gaming hardware, and levels inspired by the limited-release Super Mario Bros. Special.

Development

The game was created by Jay Pavlina. Further development is done by Zach Robinson, Mathew Valente, et al. Music was emulated with Blargg's Game Music Emu. It took 15 months to create.  It was written using ActionScript 3, and made in Adobe Flash CS5.
The game was instantly very popular on Newgrounds where it was first posted. After its first six hours online, the game had 12,000 views and had won two awards. His next update, version 1.2, released on December 15, 2010, included Sophia the 3rd as a playable character, as well as some minor bugfixes. Versions 1.0 and 1.1 were called Super Mario Crossover.

Version 2.0, released on February 9, 2012, added Luigi and Bass as playable characters. The update will also allow the user to switch between various graphical looks resembling other games from the Super Mario Bros. series, including Super Mario Land 2: 6 Golden Coins and Super Mario Bros. 3.

On March 29, 2012, Zach Robinson made a poll deciding which game between Super Mario Bros.: The Lost Levels and Super Mario Bros. Special will end up being in a future update. While Super Mario Bros.: The Lost Levels received more votes, Jay Pavlina showed more interest in Special, which was slated for inclusion in Version 3.0. He later released The Lost Levels in version 3.1, slated as the last major release.

An Atari-style version of Super Mario Bros. Crossover was also created as an April Fools' joke, but the graphics and music have since been incorporated into Version 3.0.

In November 2014, all non Exploding Rabbit related topics on the Exploding Rabbit forums were moved to "New Game Plus" at www.new-game-plus.com, a new site that was not owned by Pavlina. New Game Plus lasted for three years until it closed down in November 2017 due to lack of funds to keep the server up.

A WebGL port of the game was planned under Version 4.0 with an experimental preview, but it was ultimately canceled due to getting a demanding job.

Super Retro Squad / Super Action Squad
In June 2012, Exploding Rabbit started a Kickstarter campaign to raise money for Super Retro Squad, a game inspired by Crossover. As all the elements in Crossover are copyrighted, Lead developer Jay Pavlina recognized he would not be able to make any profit on his time spent for that game, thus Super Retro Squad would feature original characters, art, and gameplay inspired by the characters and games from Crossover, and would be a commercial endeavour. The Kickstarter surpassed its initial $10,000 request, raising $53,509, and additional features were promised for having surpassed the goal.

Unlike Crossover, Super Retro Squad was being made by a team of 6 members hand-picked by Jay. Development on Super Retro Squad began on October 1, 2012, under the Unity game engine. The project went under many changes, including visuals and game mechanics.

In September 2013, it was renamed as Super Action Squad. Its development was indefinitely suspended.

Glitch Strikers

In February 2017, Exploding Rabbit announced that "Super Action Squad" was renamed to "Glitch Strikers", and development on the game resumed since. It was released on Steam as part of its Greenlight service, and was approved for release. Glitch Strikers will contain level packs, in which each pack pertains to a certain character's environment/game, starting with "Hyper Manni Pals", a parody of Super Mario Bros. From there, all other level packs will be available as downloadable content on the Steam platform. As of 2022, there has been no news of further developments and may have been suspended indefinitely again.

Reception
Super Mario Bros. Crossover has received positive attention from gaming journalists.  Wireds Chris Kohler considered the game a "surprisingly thoughtful 8-bit mashup" and praised Pavlina's efforts for "how these six disparate characters all feel like they were ripped from their own classic NES titles, but fit in perfectly to the Mario levels". Margaret Lyons from Entertainment Weekly called the combination of characters with the Mario universe "a mindfrak for the ages". Dan Ryckert of Game Informer appreciated the attention to detail, from both the original levels of Super Mario Bros., and the music and sound effects from the other games, that were present in the game.

References

External links
Official website

2010 video games
Crossover video games
Fangames
Flash games
Unofficial works based on Mario
Video games developed in the United States